Standing Together is an album by jazz guitarist George Benson that was released in 1998.

There is also a hidden track he once recorded before Star of A Story on this album.

Track listing
 "C-Smooth" (DeChown Jenkins, Jaz Sawyer) - 5:54
 "Standing Together" (Manuel Seals, Steven Dubin) - 4:07
 "All I Know" (Peter Roberts, Scott Cross) - 4:36
 "Cruise Control" (Alex Al, Paul Peterson, Ricky Peterson) - 5:08
 "Poquito Spanish, Poquito Funk" (George Benson, Carl K. Gonzalez, Louie Vega) - 5:15
 "Still Waters" (Larry Loftin) - 4:36
 "Fly By Night" (Paul Brown, Steven Dubin, Tim Heintz) - 4:51
 "Back To Love" (Audrez Martells, Gary Haas) - 4:39
 "Keep Rollin'" (Gerald McCauley, Nils Jiptner) - 5:11

Bonus Track
10. "You Can Do It, Baby" (George Benson, Carl K. Gonzalez, Louie Vega) - 7:04

Japanese Bonus Track
11. "Turn It Up" - 2:11

Personnel and credits 
Musicians

 George Benson – guitar (1, 3, 4, 5, 7-11), lead vocals (2-11)
 DeChown Jenkens – guitar (1, 4, 7)
 Mike Sims – guitar (2)
 Paul Jackson Jr. – guitar (3)
 Marc Antoine – Spanish guitar (6)
 Nils Lofgren – guitar (9)
 Robert C. Benson – programming (1)
 Melvin Davis – keyboards (1)
 Ricky Peterson – keyboards (1, 3, 4, 6, 8), vibraphone (1), arrangements
 Steve Dubin – programming (2, 7), arrangements (2, 7)
 Tim Heintz – keyboards (2, 7), synth strings (4)
 Albert "Sterling" Menendez – keyboards (5, 10)
 Paul Brown – programming (6)
 Gerald McCauley – keyboards (9)
 Alex Al – bass guitar (1, 4, 9, 11)
 Larry Kimpel – bass guitar (3)
 Carlos Henríquez – upright bass (5)
 Lil' John Roberts – drums (1, 3, 4, 6, 8, 9, 11)
 Kevin Ricard – percussion (1, 9)
 Lenny Castro – percussion (2, 3, 4, 6, 7, 8)
 Luisito Quintero – percussion (5)
 Larry Williams – saxophone (3)
 Bill Reichenbach Jr. – trombone (3)
 Jerry Hey – trumpet (3), horn arrangements (3)
 Sue Ann Carwell – backing vocals (3)
 Jeff Pescetto – backing vocals (3)
 Bennie Diggs – backing vocals (5)
 La India – backing vocals (5)
 Reggie Burrell – backing vocals (6)
 Vonciele Faggett – backing vocals (6)
 Bridgette Bryant-Fiddmont – backing vocals (8)
 Kevin Edmonds – backing vocals (8)
 Lynne Fiddmont – backing vocals (8)
 Fred White – backing vocals (8)

Production

 Tommy LiPuma – executive producer
 Paul Brown – producer (1-4, 6–9, 11), mixing
 Kenny "Dope" Gonzalez  – producer (5, 10), mixing
 Little Louie Vega – producer (5, 10), mixing
 Martin Christianson – engineer
 Dave Darlington – engineer, mixing
 David Rideau – engineer, mixing
 Tim Tan – engineer
 Stuart Brawley – assistant engineer
 Oscar Monsalve – assistant engineer
 Rick Pohronezny – assistant engineer
 Oscar Ramirez – assistant engineer
 Daniel Steinberg – assistant engineer
 Wassim Zreik – assistant engineer
 Doug Sax – mastering at The Mastering Lab (Hollywood, CA).
 Lexy Shroyer – production coordination
 Daniela Federici – photography
 Hollis King – art direction
 Isabelle Wong – graphic design

Charts

References

1998 albums
George Benson albums
GRP Records albums